Bhojpur is a village in Sambalpur district, Odisha, India.

Geography

Location
National Highway 200 passes through Bhojpur. It is 13 km from Kuchinda.

References

Cities and towns in Sambalpur district